Tashkichi (Taşkisew) is a rural locality (a village) in Bazitamaksky Selsoviet, Ilishevsky District, Bashkortostan, Russia. The population was 217 as of 2010. There are 2 streets.

Geography 
Tashkichi is located 39 km northeast of Verkhneyarkeyevo (the district's administrative centre) by road. Tatarsky Meneuz is the nearest rural locality.

References 

Rural localities in Ilishevsky District